Ross Alexander Collins (April 25, 1880 – July 14, 1968) was a U.S. Representative from Mississippi.

Born in Collinsville, Mississippi, Collins attended the public schools of Meridian, Mississippi, and Mississippi Agricultural and Mechanical College.
He graduated from the University of Kentucky at Lexington in 1900 and from the law department of the University of Mississippi at Oxford in 1901.
He was admitted to the bar in 1901 and commenced practice in Meridian, Mississippi.
He served as Mississippi Attorney General from 1912 to 1920.
He was an unsuccessful candidate for Governor of Mississippi in 1919.

Collins was elected as a Democrat to the Sixty-seventh and to the six succeeding Congresses (March 4, 1921 – January 3, 1935).  In 1929, Collins successfully proposed the Library of Congress's $1.5 million purchase of Otto Vollbehr's collection of incunabula, including one of four remaining perfect vellum copies of the Gutenberg Bible.  He was not a candidate for renomination in 1934, but was an unsuccessful candidate for the Democratic nomination for United States Senator.

Collins was elected to the Seventy-fifth, Seventy-sixth, and Seventy-seventh Congresses (January 3, 1937 – January 3, 1943).

In the late 1930s he was the chairman of the House Subcommittee on District Appropriations; during his time in office, he cut spending on local DC funds for welfare and education stating that "my constituents wouldn't stand for spending money on niggers".

He was an unsuccessful candidate for election to the United States Senate in 1941.
He was not a candidate for renomination in 1942, but was an unsuccessful candidate for the Democratic nomination for United States Senator.
He resumed the practice of law.
He died in Meridian, Mississippi, July 14, 1968.
He was interred in Magnolia Cemetery.

External links
Ross Alexander Collins Collection (MUM00082) owned by the University of Mississippi.

References

1880 births
1968 deaths
Democratic Party members of the United States House of Representatives from Mississippi
Politicians from Meridian, Mississippi
Mississippi Attorneys General
20th-century American politicians
People from Collinsville, Mississippi